Vanity or Young Woman at her Toilette is a c.1630-1635 oil on canvas painting by the French artist Nicolas Régnier. It has been in the collection of the Museum of Fine Arts of Lyon since 1976.

References

1630s paintings
French paintings
Paintings in the collection of the Museum of Fine Arts of Lyon
Women in art